Zipcube is an online marketplace enabling people to lease or rent short-term professional space such as meeting rooms, conference space, office space, work space and event space. The company acts as a broker and receives service fees (commissions) from participating venues on a pay-per-booking basis. Zipcube operates in cities throughout Europe and the United States.

Operations
Zipcube can be accessed online via the Zipcube website. Prospective customers may filter listed venues through search criteria such as type, location, price, seating arrangement, and seating capacity. Zipcube generates revenue by charging bookers the venue price and collecting a percentage of that price as commission from the venue operators.

History

Zipcube was founded in December 2013 by Guillaume Santacruz at Google's Campus London, located in East London Tech City. Santacruz noticed the complexity involved in setting up meetings. This prompted him to develop a service that allowed users to directly book venues and cut down inquiry times. David Hellard came on as Head of Sales and Marketing early on. His associate, William Dugdale, followed soon after that. Dugdale brought technical expertise to the team from his experience working in software architecture at HSBC and Imperial College London. Hellard and Dugdale had studied there together, both writing for Felix, Imperial's Student Newspaper, and as sabbaticals in the Student's Union.

Over its first three years, Zipcube competed in many startup competitions and accelerator programs to market and grow the business. In 2014, Zipcube competed in the Think Digital Start-Up Competition and finished first. In 2015, Zipcube participated in PayPal and Braintree's 6 month Start Tank program. Start Tank offered the company mentorship and access to venture capital that helped get the start-up off the ground. Zipcube finished first in the Start Tank program. Over the next year, the team worked on establishing itself in the UK market. Once it had a strong foothold, Zipcube began expansion into the French, German, and US markets.

References

External links
 Official website 

Online marketplaces of the United Kingdom